Malir is a town in Karachi, Pakistan

Malir may also refer to;
Malir District, an administrative unit of Sindh, Pakistan
Malir River, a river in Pakistan
Malir Cantonment, a cantonment in Pakistan
Malir River Bridge, a bridge in Pakistan
Malir railway station, a railway station in Pakistan
Malir Development Authority, a development authority of Malir District

See also